Polytech Nice Sophia is a French engineering university based in the middle of the Sophia Antipolis technology park.

The school has 989 engineering students, 50 doctoral students, 75 faculty members, 22 administrative and technical staff and 7 research laboratories associated. More than 200 engineers graduate each year.

Polytech Nice Sophia is a member of the Polytech Group Network.

History and Location

Establishing 
Polytech Nice Sophia School is created as a result of the association of the Engineering Schools of ESINSA, ESSI and Magisterium of Pharmacology at the publication of Decree No. 2005 - 219 at the French "Journal Officiel" on March 10, 2005.
Polytech Nice Sophia is the Polytechnic Engineering school of the Côte d'Azur University.

Location 
The new Sophie-Politan campus of Nice Sophia University was inaugurated in September 2012, while the project is still not finished. Polytech campus is based on two separate area :
 The "Lucioles" area (ex Magisterium of Pharmacology) grouping PeiP, ISEM and Miage.
 The "Templier" area (ex ESSI) including every students engineering promotions (Master of Advanced Studies)

Administration 

The new school is a member of Polytech Group was managed by Francis Rocca until the September 1st, 2007.
Philippe Gourbesville succeeds to Roger Marlin and seat as the Director of Polytech Nice Sophia considering the agreement of the School Administrative Council (AC) on July 2, 2007. Philippe Gourbesville was re-elected on July 11, 2012, for a term of 5 more years.

References 

Education in France